Červené Pečky is a market town in Kolín District in the Central Bohemian Region of the Czech Republic. It has about 1,900 inhabitants.

Administrative parts
Villages of Bohouňovice I, Bojiště, Bořetice, Dolany and Opatovice are administrative parts of Červené Pečky.

Geography
It lies in on the border between the Upper Sázava Hills and Central Elbe Table.

History
The first written mention of Pečky is from 1333. The village was promoted to a market town in 1755 by Empress Maria Theresa. From 1794, Pečky was owned by the Barons of Hrubý and prospered. In 1868, the market town changed its name to Červené Pečky.

Sights
One of the two landmarks of Červené Pečky is the Church of the Nativity of the Virgin Mary. it is originally a Gothic church with a Renaissance tower, later rebuilt in the Baroque and Neoclassical styles.

The Červené Pečky Castle is a Baroque castle from the 17th century, founded by the Trauttmansdorff family. It is surrounded by a castle park.

References

External links

Market towns in the Czech Republic